The Flugschule Wings Alfa is an Austrian high-wing, single-place, hang glider that was designed and produced by Flugschule Wings, a flying school based in Spital am Pyhrn.

Design and development
The Alpha was developed by Flugschule Wings as a training glider for their own use and also for sale. The resulting design is a simple, single surface wing that was DHV certified in the "1-2" classification. The aircraft was available in 2003, but now appears to be out of production.

The aircraft is made from aluminum tubing, with the single surface wing covered in Dacron sailcloth. Its  span wing is cable braced and has an aspect ratio of 6.0:1.

The Alfa is also certified for powered harnesses to allow it to fly as a powered hang glider.

Specifications (Alfa)

References

Hang gliders